Neubaugasse  is a station on  of the Vienna U-Bahn. It is located in the Neubau District. It opened in 1993.

References

External links 
 

Buildings and structures in Neubau
Railway stations opened in 1993
Vienna U-Bahn stations